Shadia Nankya (born 25 November 2001) is a Ugandan footballer who plays as a defender for FUFA Women Super League club UCU Lady Cardinals FC and the Uganda women's national team.

Club career
Nankya has played for UCU Lady Cardinals in Uganda.

International career
Nankya capped for Uganda at senior level during the 2021 COSAFA Women's Championship and the 2022 Africa Women Cup of Nations qualification.

International goals
Scores and results list Uganda goal tally first

References

External links

2001 births
Uganda Christian University alumni
Living people
Ugandan women's footballers
Women's association football defenders
Uganda women's international footballers
21st-century Ugandan women